Apsny is an Abkhaz-language daily newspaper and the oldest newspaper in Abkhazia. It was founded on 27 February 1919, its first editor was the writer Dmitry Gulia. Initially, Apsny was published twice every month, later it became a daily publication.

From 1921 to 1991 the paper was named "Аҧсны ҟаҧшь" ("Red Abkhazia").

References

Newspapers published in Abkhazia
Abkhaz-language newspapers
Newspapers established in 1919
Mass media in Sukhumi
1919 establishments in Abkhazia